James Rush (1786–1869) was an American physician and writer.

Life 
James Rush, son of doctor Benjamin Rush, was born in Philadelphia, Pennsylvania, on March 1, 1786. He graduated from Princeton in 1805, and at the medical department of the University of Pennsylvania in 1809. He subsequently studied in Edinburgh, and, returning to Philadelphia, practised for several years, but afterward relinquished the active duties of his profession to devote himself to scientific and literary pursuits. He died in Philadelphia on May 26, 1869. He left $1,000,000 for the Philadelphia Library Company for the erection of the Ridgeway Branch of the Philadelphia Library.

Works 
His publications include: 
 Philosophy of the Human Voice (Philadelphia, 1827); 
 Hamlet, a Dramatic Prelude in Five Acts (1834); 
 Analysis of the Human Intellect (2 vols., 1865);
 Rhymes of Contrast on Wisdom and Folly (1869).

Personal life 
His wife, Phoebe Ann Rush, was one of the daughters of Jacob Ridgeway.

References

Sources 
 Kurtz, Stephen G. (1954). "James Rush, Pioneer in American Psychology, 1786–1869". Bulletin of the History of Medicine, 28(1): pp. 50–59.

Attribution:

External links 
 Ockerbloom, John Mark, ed. "Rush, James, 1786-1869". The Online Books Page. Retrieved 17 August 2022.

1786 births
1869 deaths
19th-century American physicians
19th-century American writers
19th-century American male writers